Tom L. Burnett (born January 1, 1954) is an American politician and a Republican Party former member of the Montana House of Representatives. He represented District 63 from 2013 to 2015, and District 67 from 2015 to 2021.

Born in Sheridan, Montana, Burnett is a graduate of Montana State University. Burnett owned and operated a small business, Marathon Seat Covers, from 1978 until March 2007.

Early life, education, and career
Burnett was born in Sheridan, Montana and raised in Bozeman, Montana. He is the son of Darwin Burnett, a school teacher, and Barbara Burnett, a full-time homemaker. He graduated from Bozeman Senior High School. Burnett received his undergraduate degree in agriculture from Montana State University, where he graduated with honors.

He was unsuccessful in his first race for Montana District 63, losing in 2008 to Jennifer Pomnichowski. He ran again in 2010 against Jennifer Pomnichowski and was elected. In 2012 he was defeated by Franke Wilmer.

In 2014 he was elected as Representative of District 67, beating Jeannie Brown. He ran again in 2016 beating Mike Houghton.

External links
Tom Burnett page on Montana Legislature website
Official Tom Burnett for HD63 website
Project Vote Smart - Tom Burnett (MT) profile
Tom Burnett blog Goodness is Cool

1954 births
Living people
Montana State University alumni
Candidates in the 2008 United States elections
Candidates in the 2010 United States elections
Candidates in the 2012 United States elections
Candidates in the 2014 United States elections
Candidates in the 2016 United States elections
Candidates in the 2018 United States elections
21st-century American politicians
Republican Party members of the Montana House of Representatives
People from Sheridan County, Montana